Benton is an area of North Tyneside in Tyne and Wear, England. The parish of St Bartholomew, Longbenton, is within the North Tyneside district. The population of the North Tyneside Ward taken at the Census 2011 was 10,359. The area is contiguous with the suburbs of Newcastle.

History
The centre of the Benton district is the old village of Longbenton which stretches along Front Street on the Old Coast Road. The opening of the station in the nineteenth century caused the district around the railway to be developed as a desirable, out-of-town suburb. It retains its character to this day and two areas, around the village itself and around the station, have been designated as conservation areas. Benton Metro station dates from 1871. The line was electrified in the early years of the twentieth century and later became part of the Metro system. The original station buildings are still in use.

Architecture
There are also Metro stations at Four Lane Ends and Longbenton. To the north west of the station, stretching across to South Gosforth, is Longbenton Estate. This area is undergoing substantial redevelopment and refurbishment. Longbenton Community College, the home of Longbenton Community College Senior Choir who recently toured Prague, is situated in Hailsham Avenue. Other places of education within the locality include Benton Park Primary School, which opened in 1953 and is part of Newcastle L.A., and St Bartholomew's C of E Primary School, which is part of North Tyneside L.A. Three other North Tyneside primary schools are located on Longbenton Estate: the new Benton Dene school, Balliol, and St Stephen's RC.
Northumbria University has a campus on Coach Lane.

There are three public houses in the village: The Benton Alehouse (formerly The Sun Inn), The Black Bull and The Ship Inn. An Italian restaurant, Casa Antonio, is situated on Front Street.

St Aidan's RC Church is a modern building at the corner of Whitley Road and Coach Lane. St Andrew's Church (Methodist and URC Combined) and St Bartholomew's Church (Anglican), the Parish Church, are located on Station Road, to the north of the railway line. On Longbenton Estate there is a Methodist church on Chester's Avenue; the Anglican St Mary Magdalene on West Farm Avenue and St Peter and St Paul's RC Church in Bardsey Place.

Notable people
Jimmy Nail, Actor and singer, was born at Benton in 1954, though he now lives in London.
Peter Beardsley. Former Footballer for several English clubs who lived in Benton as a child

References

External links

Districts of Newcastle upon Tyne
Metropolitan Borough of North Tyneside